Platydemus manokwari, also known as the New Guinea flatworm, is a large predatory land flatworm that has become an invasive species in many countries.

Native to New Guinea, it was accidentally introduced to the soil of many countries. It was also deliberately introduced into two Pacific islands in an attempt to control an invasion of the Giant East African Snail. It eats a variety of invertebrates including land snails, and has had a significant negative impact on the rare endemic land snail fauna of some Pacific islands. It has become established in a wide variety of habitats. It was recorded in 2014 from a hothouse in Caen, France, its first finding in Europe, and in 2015 from New Caledonia, Wallis and Futuna Islands, Singapore, Solomon Islands, Puerto Rico (first record in the Caribbean), and Florida, USA. More recently, it was recorded from mainland Asia, in Thailand in 2018  and Hong-Kong in 2019. The researchers said that "while most of the infected territories reported until now were islands,  the newly reported presence of the species in mainland US in Florida should be considered a potential major threat to the whole US and even the Americas".

Islands invaded 
Platydemus manokwari has been introduced to several tropical and subtropical islands such as Micronesia; the Marquesas; the Society Islands; Samoa; Melanesia; and the Hawaiian Islands. These islands often harbor endemic radiations of rare and endangered snail species, which are a primary source of nutrition for P. manokwari. P. manokwari has also been introduced to several Japanese Islands. In the Caribbean, it was recorded in 2015 from Puerto Rico, in 2020 from Guadeloupe, and in 2021 from Martinique and Saint Martin.

Methods and purpose of introduction
Although native to New Guinea, P. manokwari has been found in many tropical and temperate regions of the world. There are several methods by which P. manokwari has been introduced to these areas.
Some methods are accidental. One such is the sale of tropical plants and potting soil that contains P. manokwari. Another method of accidental introduction occurs through the movement of machinery and equipment. P. manokwari are often found in the leftover soil on the construction equipment and when the soil is transferred, P. manokwari is also transported. P. manokwari can also be transferred to new areas through the accidental transfer of seed material used to restore vegetation.

P. manokwari  has also sometimes been introduced intentionally, as a biological control agent. In  various areas such as Guam and the Okinawa islands, P. manokwari was introduced to control the population of the invasive Giant African land snail, which had damaged crops and threatened the agricultural industry. It has been said that "much of the 'evidence' that these predators can control Achatina fulica populations is based on a poor understanding of ecological principles. That the predators will prey on [Giant African land snail] is not evidence that they can control its populations...". The flatworm controlled the population of the Giant African land snail but it also began preying on populations of endemic land snail, which led to an unprecedented increase in the P. manokwari populations and a marked decrease in the endemic land snail populations.

Ecological effects of invasion
Platydemus manokwari has had several effects on the ecology of the communities that it has been introduced to. In the Pacific Islands that P. manokwari has invaded, several native land snails, specifically the Partula, Mandarina, juvenile M. aureola, B. similaris, Allopeas kyotoense, and Meghimatium bilineatum have either gone extinct or their numbers have drastically reduced. P. manokwari is such an efficient and invasive species that it has caused the decline and extinction of gastropods in several islands and is known as one of the ‘100 world’s worst invaders’.

The success of P. manokwari as an invasive species can be attributed to several factors. One explanation is that P. manokwari has very few, if any, known predators and thus has few biotic limiting factors. Also, P. manokwari exhibits high tolerance for several environments.  However, P. manokwari cannot survive in colder environments. P. manokwari has also shown versatility in prey tracking and attack methods of snail species. Experiments conducted by Yamaura and Sugiura indicated that P. manokwari can climb trees and track down nonmarine mollusks using olfactory cues.

Experiments have shown that out of five other flatworm species, P. manokwari was by far the most efficient. In an experiment done by Isamu Okochi and colleagues, 5 different flatworm species (including P. manokwari) were kept in various storage units containing endemic snail species. Out of these five species, P. manokwari was the only species that had started to prey on the snail species within a day of introduction. Two of the other predatory flatworm species did prey on the snails, but their rates of predation were not consistent. This indicates that P. manokwari outcompetes other predatory flatworm species and consumes more endemic land species than other species. Furthermore, these data indicate that P. manokwari can begin consuming endemic land snails right after introduction. In other words, P. manokwari can adjust to a new environment fairly quickly and can even destroy fragile ecosystems quickly.

Control methods 
Currently, there are no known methods for controlling the population of P. manokwari. This makes the eradication of the invasive species especially difficult. However, in several other cases, modified versions of parasites and viruses have been used as a biological control agent for invasive species.

Several scientists have theorized that one of the few limiting factors that prevents the expansion of P. manokwari is low tolerance to colder temperatures. P. manokwari thrive best in habitats that range of 18 to 28 °C, which is commonly found in many tropical and subtropical islands. In an experiment done by Shinji Sugiura, P. manokwari were placed in several containers that had a certain amount of land snails in each and allowed to interact with them for a period of fourteen days in temperatures varying from 10 to 26 °C. Of those in the containers kept at 10 °C, only 23.3% survived all fourteen days and none of them fed on the snails. As temperatures increased, an increase in predation and survival of P. manokwari was observed. This shows that P. manokwari is significantly limited in distribution at lower temperatures, but can often flourish at higher temperatures.

Future of the invaded communities 
The major uncertainty regarding communities invaded by P. manokwari involves the survival of endemic snail populations. According to current data, predation by P. manokwari is the biggest cause of the extinction of several native and introduced gastropods (a class of mollusks that include snails and slugs). These data suggest that the population of endemic land snails that have not already gone extinct is sharply decreasing in the areas the P. manokwari has been introduced. Furthermore, there is little hope for endemic land snail populations in areas inhabited by P. manokwari to recover to their original population size before P. manokwari was introduced. This is because the species is such an efficient and active predator that species that its controls prey populations and prevents them from recovering. Although beneficial for farmers and agriculture of the area, this decrease of snail population is problematic because it can drastically alter the food webs and interactions between endemic organisms in the island, which can then affect the delicate ecosystem of the islands. Thus, it is uncertain how ecosystems will change with persisting predation by P. manokwari.

Image gallery: Platydemus manokwari in various countries

References

Further reading 
 Muniappan R. (1990) "Use of the planarian, P. manokwari, and other natural enemies to control the giant African snail". In: Bay-Petersen J. (ed.) The use of natural enemies to control agricultural pests. Food and Fertilizer Technology Center for the Asian and Pacific Region, Taipei, pp 179–183.
 Sherley G. (ed.) (June 2000) Invasive species in the Pacific: A technical review and draft regional strategy. South Pacific Regional Environment Programme, Apia, Samoa. 190 pp., PDF .

External links 
The New Guinea flatworm visits France – a menace at Earthling nature.

Fauna of New Guinea
Geoplanidae
Invasive animal species